Verheiden is a surname. Notable people with the surname include:

Jacobus Verheiden (fl. 1590–1618), Dutch schoolmaster and writer
Mark Verheiden (born 1956), American television, movie, and comic book writer

See also
Verheijen
Verheyden